Vest Buss is a former Norwegian bus and coach bodywork manufacturer, and is currently the official distributor for Iveco Bus in Norway and Sweden.

The company was founded in Stryn in 1965 as Vest Karosseri AS, building their first bus bodywork in 1967. In 2002 the company was renamed Vest-Busscar AS, after Brazilian bus manufacturer Busscar acquired a 35% share. By 2006 Busscar had sold out and it was renamed Vest Buss AS. In 2009 they became the official distributor for Irisbus in Norway and Sweden. In 2010 it was decided to close down the production of their own bodywork in early 2011, which was briefly continued by Vidre AS.

Models
 Vest Ambassadør
 Vest Liner
 Vest V10/V25
 Vest V10LE/V25LE
 Vest Contrast
 Vest Center
 Vest Horisont

External links

Defunct bus manufacturers
Stryn
1965 establishments in Norway
Companies based in Sogn og Fjordane
Bus manufacturers of Norway